William Shaw may refer to:

Sports
 Billy Shaw (born 1938), American college and professional football player
 Billy Shaw (Australian footballer) (1872–1938), Australian rules footballer for St Kilda and Melbourne
 Bill Shaw (footballer, born 1886) (1886–?), Scottish footballer who played for Kilmarnock, Bristol Rovers and Dumbarton Harp
 Bill Shaw (Australian footballer) (1915–1994), Australian rules footballer for Footscray
 William Shaw (cricketer) (1827–1890), English cricketer
 William Shaw (footballer) (1897–?), English footballer
 William Shaw (born 1902–?), English footballer for Barcelona and Northampton Town

Politicians
 William Shaw (Glasgow politician) (died 1937), Scottish trade unionist and Labour Party councilor
 William Shaw (Illinois politician) (1937–2008), American politician
 William Shaw (Irish politician) (1823–1895), Irish Protestant nationalist politician and leader of the Home Rule League
 William Shaw (New Brunswick politician) (1839–1922), farmer, baker and political figure in New Brunswick, Canada
 William Shaw (Oregon politician), member of the Oregon Territorial Legislature, 1850
 William Shaw (Quebec politician) (1932–2018), Canadian politician and Member of the National Assembly of Quebec, 1976–1981
 William McNairn Shaw (1822–1868), Ontario lawyer and political figure
 William Rawson Shaw (1860–1932), British politician, MP for Halifax, 1893–1897
 William T. Shaw (1879–1965), British Member of Parliament for Forfar, 1918–1922 and 1931–1945

Others
 Bill Shaw, southern gospel tenor with The Blackwood Brothers
 William Shaw (Gaelic scholar) (1749–1831), author of A Galic and English dictionary: Containing all the words in the Scotch and Irish
 Bill Kennedy Shaw (1901–1979), British desert explorer, botanist, archaeologist and founding member of the Long Range Desert Group
 William Shaw (agricultural writer) (1797–1853), writer, editor and translator who founded the Farmers Club in 1842
 William Shaw, Canadian inventor and cofounder of IMAX Corporation
 William Shaw (actor) in The Choppers
 William Shaw (businessman), president and chief operating officer of Marriott International Inc
 William Shaw (engineer) (1830–1896), Irish-born Australian engineer
 William Shaw (laboratory owner), founder of the Great Plains Laboratory, which sells nonstandard laboratory tests
 William Shaw (mathematician) (born 1958), British mathematician
 William Shaw (minister), 18th century British Christian clergyman who founded Barton, Maryland in the United States in 1794
 William Shaw (philosopher) (born 1948), chair of the Philosophy department in San José State University
 William Shaw (writer), British journalist and writer
 William Shaw (yacht designer) (1926–2006), American yacht designer
 William James Shaw (1877–1939), founded the Wack Wack Golf & Country Club, namesake of Shaw Boulevard
 William J. Shaw (preacher) (born 1926), American preacher, see National Baptist Convention, USA, Inc.
 William Arthur Shaw (1865–1943), English historian
 William Smith Shaw (1778–1826), American librarian
 William Fletcher Shaw (1878–1961), English obstetric physician and gynaecologist